Harry Amoo Dodoo (8 August 1918 – 10 February 2000) was a Ghanaian chartered accountant, public servant and businessman who led the Ghana Cocoa Board at different times as chief accountant, general manager, managing director, chief executive and chairman.  He was the first Gold Coast native to be a chartered accountant and the first Gold Coast indigene to work with Cassleton Elliot and Company (now KPMG).  
 
Dodoo was the organizational leader of the Cocoa Marketing Board as general manager from 1955 to 1965,  and as managing director from 1965 to 1967, and the chief executive on its restructuring as Ghana Cocoa Board from 1983 to 1986.

Early life and education
Harry Dodoo was born on 8 August 1918 at Accra, Greater Accra Region, Gold Coast. He studied at the Accra Academy from 1935 to 1938.

Career
Dodoo begun his career at the Accountant General's department, where he worked from 1939 until 1945. In 1945 he became an Articled clerk training in the field of Accountancy at Cassleton Elliot and Company (now KPMG). In 1949, he qualified as a Chartered Accountant and became a member of the Institute of Chartered Accountants in England and Wales. He consequently became the first Gold Coast native to qualify as a Chartered Accountant in the Gold Coast. He worked as a Chartered Accountant with the firm from 1950 until 1952.  
 
In 1952 he was appointed accountant for the Ghana Cocoa Marketing Board (now Ghana Cocoa Board). In 1953 he was promoted to chief accountant and on 25 May 1955 he became the general manager of the Ghana Cocoa Marketing Board.  
 
In September 1960, Dodoo was appointed by President Kwame Nkrumah to a Committee to enquire into the Cost of Living which was chaired by S.B. Ofori and included Kwesi Amoako-Atta, J. V. L. Phillips, H. Millar-Craig and E. N. Omaboe. 
 
Dodoo served in the capacity of general manager of C.M.B. until 1 March 1965 when he was re-titled managing director. In July 1966, he became acting chairman of the board of directors of the Cocoa Marketing Board, whilst still as managing director, when Nana Sir Tsibu Darku left the role. On 29th July 1966, William Ofori-Atta replaced Dodoo to become substantive chairman with an appointment by the National Liberation Council. Dodoo served as managing director of the Ghana Cocoa Marketing Board until 22 February 1967 when he resigned. 

In 1969, he ventured into private business by establishing Dodoo Lobban & Co., (now Lobban Hyde) an audit and accountancy firm in Ghana with William Drummond Lobban as partner. He retired from the firm in 1979. He served as president of the Institute of Chartered Accountants of Ghana from 1974 to 1976. His other directorships included Fan Milk, Blackwood Hodge (Ghana), Hansa Manufacturing Company Limited, Ghana Consolidated Diamonds and Ghana Aluminium Products. In the early 1960s he served on the board of the Ghana Main Reef Limited.   
 
In October 1981, President Hilla Limann appointed Dodoo as chairman of the governing board of the Cocoa Marketing Board. In 1983, Dodoo was appointed acting chief executive of Ghana Cocoa Board (COCOBOD) by Chairman Jerry Rawlings, serving until 1986. On 25 September 1986, he was appointed as chairman of the board of directors of Ghana Cocoa Board. He resigned from the board of directors on 26 April 1988.

Others 
He was vice president of the Association of Accountants of the Gold Coast (which was later renamed; the Association of Accountants in Ghana), he also served on the first council of the Institute of Chartered Accountants of Ghana and was also a past president of the institute. He was a member of the Council of State in the Third Republic.

Personal life and death
He enjoyed music and dancing. He died on 10 February 2000 at the Korle-Bu Teaching Hospital, Accra.

See also
Institute of Chartered Accountants of Ghana

References

1918 births
2000 deaths
Alumni of the Accra Academy
Ghanaian accountants